William Frederick Stock, M.P., (c. August 1847 – 23 November 1913) was briefly Attorney-General of South Australia in 1892.

Stock was born in Clifton St Andrew, Gloucestershire, England, a son of Robert Stock and Caroline Stock, née Holland, and christened there on 3 September 1847. Stock was one of five children who with their widowed mother sailed to South Australia aboard Statesman, arriving in February 1850. He was educated at Adelaide Educational Institution and St. Peter's College, Adelaide, and in England. He was admitted to the South Australian Bar in June 1871, and was three times Mayor of Glenelg in the late 1870s. He was President of the Railway Employees' Association. 
In 1886 he entered into a limited form of partnership with his nephew Sydney Talbot Smith as Stock & Talbot Smith.

In 1887 he was elected to the seat of Sturt in the South Australian House of Assembly. In June 1892, on the accession to power of the Holder Ministry, Stock was appointed Attorney-General.

On 23 November 1913, Stock died at a private hospital in North Adelaide after a long illness.

His widow Mary Stock (previously Haigh, née Spicer) was a prominent worker for the Cheer-Up Society.

References

1847 births
1913 deaths
Members of the South Australian House of Assembly
English emigrants to Australia
Mayors of places in South Australia
Attorneys-General of South Australia